Wen Prefecture may refer to:

Wen Prefecture (Gansu) (文州), a prefecture between the 6th and 14th centuries in modern Gansu, China
Wen Prefecture (Zhejiang) (溫州), a prefecture between the 7th and 13th centuries in modern Zhejiang, China

See also
Wen (disambiguation)